Hong Kong, a special administrative region of the People's Republic of China, competed at the Winter Olympic Games for the first time at the 2002 Winter Olympics for Hong Kong in Salt Lake City, United States.  This delegation, separate from the China team that consisted of athletes from mainland China only, competed under the name Hong Kong, China (中國香港).

Athletes

 Tsoi Po Yee "Cordia" - Canadian-born speedskater
 Christy Ren - Hong Kong-born speedskater

Results

See also

 Sport in Hong Kong

References
Official Olympic Reports

Nations at the 2002 Winter Olympics
2002 Winter Olympics
2002 in Hong Kong sport